Davidson Charles (born 28 March 1983) is a Haitian former professional footballer who played as a striker.

Club career
Charles was born in Cabaret, Haiti. He played for different teams in the lower French divisions before moving to L'Entente SSG in summer 2007.

International career
He made his debut for Haiti in the February 2008 friendly series against Venezuela, which served as a warm-up for the 2010 FIFA World Cup qualification match against Nicaragua or the Netherlands Antilles.

References

1983 births
Living people
Association football forwards
Haitian footballers
Racing Club de France Football players
ASA Issy players
Levallois SC players
Red Star F.C. players
Entente SSG players
SAS Épinal players
Safa SC players
SO Châtellerault players
Limoges FC players
Expatriate footballers in Lebanon
Haiti international footballers
Expatriate footballers in France
Haitian expatriate sportspeople in France
Haitian expatriate sportspeople in Lebanon
Haitian expatriate footballers
Lebanese Premier League players